Ladu may refer to:

 Ladu, Afghanistan
 Ladu, Iran
 Laddu or Ladu, a South Asian confection